Benjamin Kogo (30 November 1944 – 20 January 2022) was a Kenyan athlete who specialised in 3000 metre steeplechase running.

Kogo was born on 30 November 1944. He was from Arwos, Nandi County, Kenya.

He became the first Kenyan to run steeplechase event in Olympics, was a silver medalist from 1968 Summer Olympics, in an event won by his compatriot Amos Biwott. At the 1964 Summer Olympics he failed to make the final at steeplechase. He won gold at the first All-Africa Games held in 1965 in Brazzaville. Kogo was also bronze medalist from the 1966 British Empire and Commonwealth Games.

Kogo died on 20 January 2022, at the age of 77. He had been diagnosed with prostate cancer one year prior.

References

External links
 
 Sports Reference

1944 births
2022 deaths
Kenyan male steeplechase runners
Kenyan male middle-distance runners
Athletes (track and field) at the 1964 Summer Olympics
Athletes (track and field) at the 1968 Summer Olympics
Olympic athletes of Kenya
Commonwealth Games medallists in athletics
Athletes (track and field) at the 1966 British Empire and Commonwealth Games
Athletes (track and field) at the 1970 British Commonwealth Games
Commonwealth Games bronze medallists for Kenya
People from Nandi County
Medalists at the 1968 Summer Olympics
Olympic silver medalists for Kenya
Olympic silver medalists in athletics (track and field)
African Games gold medalists for Kenya
African Games medalists in athletics (track and field)
Athletes (track and field) at the 1965 All-Africa Games
Deaths from prostate cancer
Medallists at the 1966 British Empire and Commonwealth Games